Copacetic is an album by Velocity Girl, released in 1993. It is their first full-length album and features the singles "Crazy Town" and "Audrey's Eyes," both of which were given music videos. The album's title derives from an American slang word meaning "everything's ok". Its sound is heavily influenced by shoegaze, a subgenre of indie rock.  Kelly Riles described the recording of the album: "We mixed the album in a very different way than people would have expected us to—it's very rough sounding. It's a deliberate move away from the lighter production on the singles".

A review in Lime Lizard at the time of its release drew comparisons with My Bloody Valentine, stating "this could be the rejected demos for Isn't Anything".

The album was listed among "75 Lost Classics" in the Spring 2007 issue of Magnet.

Track listing 
 "Pretty Sister" (4:59)
 "Crazy Town" (3:47)
 "Copacetic" (3:41)
 "Here Comes" (4:42)
 "Pop Loser" (2:24)
 "Living Well" (3:06)
 "A Chang" (5:48)
 "Audrey's Eyes" (3:02)
 "Lisa Librarian" (2:18)
 "57 Waltz" (2:49)
 "Candy Apples" (3:07)
 "Catching Squirrels" (5:42)

References

External links 
 Lost Classics: Velocity Girl "Copacetic", Magnet, 20 February 2009

1993 albums
Velocity Girl albums
Sub Pop albums